Bharatiya Jnanpith a literary and research organization, based in New Delhi, India, was founded on February 18, 1944 by Sahu Shanti Prasad Jain of the Sahu Jain family and his wife Rama Jain to undertake systematic research and publication of Sanskrit, Prakrit, Pali and Apabhramsha texts and covering subjects like religion, philosophy, logic, ethics, grammar, astrology, poetics, etc.

Its research and publication programme started with the publication of the Dhavala texts. A Jain temple at Moodabidri in Karnataka, southern India, had stored for centuries its manuscript of palm-leaves. It was a 9th-century commentary in Prakrit and Sanskrit, of a 2nd-century CE work, Satkhandagama, in Prakrit on the Jain doctrine of karma.

It has published two series of texts:

 Moortidevi Granthmala
 Lokodaya Granthmala

It annually publishes hundreds of books in Hindi (both original and translated works) and other languages, and also presents India's highest literary awards, the Jnanpith Awards and the Moortidevi Award.

See also 
 Manipuri Sahitya Parishad
 Sahitya Akademi

References

External links
 

Book publishing companies of India
Indology
Non-profit organisations based in India
Indic literature societies